The 1896 Northwestern Purple team represented Northwestern University during the 1896 Western Conference football season. In their second year under head coach Alvin H. Culver, and their first as a member of the Western Conference (later known as the Big Ten Conference), the Purple compiled a 6–1–2 record (2–1–1 against conference opponents) and finished in third place in the conference.

Schedule

References

Northwestern
Northwestern Wildcats football seasons
Northwestern Purple football